Elmwood may refer to the following places in the U.S. state of Michigan:

 Elmwood, Tuscola County, Michigan, an unincorporated community in Elmwood Township
 Elmwood, Iron County, Michigan, an unincorporated community in Stambaugh Township
 Elmwood Charter Township, Michigan in Leelanau County
 Elmwood Township, Michigan in Tuscola County

See also 
 Elmwood Cemetery (Detroit)